Reawadee Srithoa-Watanasin (born 11 August 1968) is a Thai sprinter. She competed in the women's 400 metres at the 1984 Summer Olympics.

References

1968 births
Living people
Athletes (track and field) at the 1984 Summer Olympics
Athletes (track and field) at the 1992 Summer Olympics
Reawadee Srithoa
Reawadee Srithoa
Reawadee Srithoa
Place of birth missing (living people)
Asian Games medalists in athletics (track and field)
Reawadee Srithoa
Reawadee Srithoa
Athletes (track and field) at the 1986 Asian Games
Athletes (track and field) at the 1990 Asian Games
Athletes (track and field) at the 1994 Asian Games
Athletes (track and field) at the 1998 Asian Games
Medalists at the 1986 Asian Games
Medalists at the 1990 Asian Games
Medalists at the 1994 Asian Games
Medalists at the 1998 Asian Games
Reawadee Srithoa
Reawadee Srithoa
Southeast Asian Games medalists in athletics
Reawadee Srithoa